Iain McColl (27 January 1954 – 4 July 2013) was a Scottish film and television actor, best known for his roles on British television series. McColl starred on City Lights, a BBC Scotland sitcom, from 1984 to 1991. He then co-starred on the BBC Two sitcom, Rab C Nesbitt during its first run (1988-1999). He rejoined the cast of Rab C Nesbitt again when the show was revived in 2008. Additionally, he appeared in guest spots on numerous other television shows, including Hamish Macbeth, Still Game and Taggart. McColl was also cast in a small role in the 2002 American film, Gangs of New York, directed by Martin Scorsese.

In 1994 he guest starred alongside his Rab C Nesbitt co star Gregor Fisher in episode 5 of The Tales of Para Handy in which, he played a religious madman who held the ships crew hostage.

Iain McColl died from complications of cancer on 4 July 2013, aged 59.

References

External links

1955 births
2013 deaths
Scottish male television actors
Scottish male film actors
Deaths from cancer in Scotland